Deborah Luster (born 1951)  is a photographic artist from Northwest Arkansas, US, and has been a professional photographer since the 1990s.  Luster has at least one book in print, One Big Self: Prisoners of Louisiana, and is known for using older technology such as tintype to document and artistically portray violent crime and related topics.  She is published and discussed in various international media such as The Economist, educational sources such as the John Simon Guggenhiem Memorial Foundation, galleries such as the Jack Shainman Gallery and San Francisco Museum of Modern Art

Career and awards

Luster jointly won a Lange-Taylor Prize in 2000 with C.D. Wright with whom she has worked as a duo for One Big Self.

Luster published a 64-page 17-inch hardcover book titled Tooth for an Eye: A Chorography of Violence in Orleans Parish in February 2011.  This work focuses on the effect a high rate of homicide has in New Orleans and each piece has a journey through it, or, "is circular, bringing the viewer through".  Deborah Luster lives and works in New Orleans and Louisiana in the US, and Galway in Ireland.  She has won the Baum Award for Emerging American Photographers in 2001, The John Gutmann Photography Fellowship in 2002, and a John Simon Guggenheim Fellowship in 2013. She is a 2017 winner of a Ford Foundation Art of Change fellowship.

Permanently featured in Whitney Museum of American Art, the San Francisco Museum of Modern Art, New Orleans Museum of Art, and the Museum of Contemporary Photography, Chicago, Deborah Luster "creates a complex and vivid portrait".

In earlier work, Luster photographed Mexican religious votive paintings and people she "connected" with to create "saints" in conjunction with C.D. Wright, poet.  The intention was to create "magical" portraits and the name of this work was Rosesucker Retablos.

Luster has documented murder scenes in New Orleans and claims to be unaffected from visiting such places, but can be quoted describing some as possessed with energy and heat.  Luster has produced more than 25,000 photographs in the last fifteen to twenty years focusing on old fashioned technology, particularly tintype, to produce a finish with an antique feel as part of the One Big Self project including inside work at Louisiana State Penitentiary.  Some pieces include graffiti and poetry and were featured free for many weeks as part of Prospect.1 New Orleans city art event.

Luster worked with C.D Wright in Louisiana State Pen for six years (1998-2003) on One Big Self making portraits of prisoners in silver-gelatin emulsion on metal boards.  Vince Aletti of The New Yorker said of her work "Suddenly, we are there, and desolation, desperation and death are very real."  She gave visiting presentations at Pratt Institute, Hendrix College and Watkins College of Art and Design in 2013, while in 2014 she was awarded residency at the Irish Museum of Modern Art.  She has been awarded the Anonymous Was A Woman Award, Peter S. Reed Foundation Grant, and the Baum Award for Emerging American Photographers.  Her work is also featured in dozens of public collections.

Luster's work on One Big Self extended to two other prisons including Angola Penitentiary and her work is permanently displayed in still more notable galleries including the Smithsonian American Art Museum.

References

External links
 Official website
 Come Shining: The Spiritual South review Rhizomes website
 Deborah Luster: One Big Self interview Kitchen Sisters

Photographers from Louisiana
Photographers from Arkansas
1951 births
Living people
20th-century American photographers
20th-century American women photographers
21st-century American photographers
21st-century American women photographers